Basic Formal Ontology (BFO) is a top-level ontology developed by Barry Smith and his associates for the purposes of promoting interoperability among domain ontologies built in its terms through a process of downward population.  A guide to building BFO-conformant domain ontologies was published by MIT Press in 2015. 

The ontology arose against the background of research in ontologies in the domain of geospatial information science by David Mark, Pierre Grenon, Achille Varzi and others, with a special role for the study of vagueness and of the ways sharp boundaries in the geospatial and other domains are created by fiat. 

BFO has passed through 4 major releases, documented here. The current revision was released in 2020, and this forms the basis of the standard, which was released by the Joint Committee of the International Standards Organization and International Electrotechnical Commission in 2021.

The structure of BFO is based on a division of entities into two disjoint categories of continuant and occurrent, the former consists of objects and spatial regions, the latter contains processes conceived as extended through (or spanning) time. BFO thereby seeks to consolidate both time and space within a single framework.

Applications

BFO has been adopted as a foundational ontology by over 450 ontology projects, principally in the areas of biomedical ontology, security and defense (intelligence) ontology, and industry ontologies. Example applications of BFO can be seen in the Ontology for Biomedical Investigations (OBI). 

In 2021, the standard ISO/IEC 21838-2:2021 Information technology — Top-level ontologies (TLO) — Part 2: Basic Formal Ontology (BFO) was published by the Joint Technical Committee of the International Standards Organization and the International Electrotechnical Commission. ISO/IEC 21838 is a multi-part standard. Part 1 of the standard specifies the requirements that must be met if an ontology is to be classified as a top-level ontology in accordance with the standard.

See also

 Formal ontology
 Ontology engineering
 Upper ontology

References

Further reading

External links
 Basic Formal Ontology (BFO)
Basic Formal Ontology 2.0
Basic Formal Ontology 2020 (GitHub)

Knowledge representation
Information science
Ontology (information science)
ISO standards